Raketa (Rocket) was the first type of hydrofoil boats commercially produced in the Soviet Union. They were manufactured from 1957 until the early 1970s. The chief designer was Rostislav Alexeyev and the project 340 vessels had been planned already in the late 1940s.

The first model, Raketa-1, was built by Krasnoye Sormovo (Красное Сормово) shipbuilding plant in Sormovo, Nizhny Novgorod (Нижний Новгород). On its maiden voyage, on 25 August 1957, it carried 30 passengers from Nizhny Novgorod to Kazan (420 km) in seven hours.

Raketa boats were soon in wide commercial service on the Volga River and elsewhere in the Soviet Union. To this day, the name is often used generically in Russian for all hydrofoil river boats. Later designs include the Meteor and Kometa types, among many others.

There were several versions of project 340 vessels: project 340 (проект 340), project 340E (проект 340Э) and project 340ME (проект 340МЕ).

Operators

Austria
"Dolphin"

Cambodia
daily service between Phnom Penh and Siem Reap

People's Republic of China

England
 River Thames

Finland

In Finland the traffic with project 340 vessel started in 1962, when the cities of Lahti and Jyväskylä had a joint-venture company, which bought one vessel. They prolonged the operations until 1983. After that the ownership was transferred to the private persons. The first name of the vessel was Tehi due to the one part of the southernmost Päijänne, Vesijärvi. Later the hydrofoils were taken off. Later M/S Tehi became M/S Suvi-Tuuli.

M/S Tehi
M/S Tehi started its operations in 1962. Later the M/S Tehi was renamed as M/S Suvi-Tuuli (without hydrofoils):Lake Päijänne cities of Lahti and Jyväskylä 1962–1983, Pyhäjärvi 2008, river Kokemäenjoki 2009-

M/S Rosetta
M/S Rosetta is Raketa 314, which was bought from Tartu of Estonia in 1993. From 1995 to 2005 it was operated under the name M/S Suvijet . It was bought from Estonia and has been operated in Lake Päijänne for Royal Cruises since 2005 after the second renaming as M/S Rosetta. Raketa-314 was built in Feodocija in 1963. It may not prolong the chartered trips on Lake Päijänne after its sale. The home harbour of M/S Rosetta is in Lahti.

The vessel does not have its original engine just like M/S Suvi-Tuuli does not have. Both of the vessels has a MAN 2842 LYE. The highest speeds are from 29 to 32 knots. During the renovation the steering was changed from the back side to the front.

Netherlands

Germany, "Rheinpfeil"
now in private collection in the Netherlands), now Raketa 72, Rotterdam

Hungary
between 1962–1985

Lithuania
The Lithuanian remaining Raketa has been operated by the UAB "Nemuno linija" line from the Kaunas passenger dock to Nida until 2010. It had two Raketas named "Aistė" and "Lina" of which "Aistė" was renovated. Both "Aistė" and "Lina" were constructed in 1963. In June 2020 first passengers was taken from Kaunas to Nida and back current "Laivas Raketa" operator is "Vši Vandens kelias"

Poland
in the Gdansk area (still in operation in 2005) and on Szczecin-Świnoujście cruise line

Romania
 8 boats were imported in Romania, Expres, Rapid, Sageata, Venus, Tismana, Fulger, Olanesti and Steaua.

Russia

FSB №831 Feodocija built 1961 
Raketa 69, Bor
Raketa 101 Mihail Kalinin'', St. Petersburg
Raketa 185, Moscow
Raketa 191, Moscow
Raketa 205, Kineshma
Raketa 246, SSK, Moscow

Slovakia
Raketa I
Raketa II
Raketa III

Ukraine

Raketa 7 in Vilkovo

Yugoslavia
Serbia, since the mid-1980s on the River Danube
Croatia, since mid '60s. "Atlas" tourist agency used 8 of them for fast transfers, island hopping and daily excursions from Split, Zadar and Dubrovnik. Also, for excursions from Istria to Venice, Italy.

They were all named starting with "Krila" (Croatian for "wings"), i.e. Krila Dubrovnika / Wings of Dubrovnik.

Since 1988, two received engine upgrades. Old, Russian engines were swapped for Italian ones manufactured by Isotta Fraschini.

Gallery

See also
Hydrofoil
Voskhod (hydrofoil)

References

Trips with Raketa and Polese hydrofoil boats
Russian River Ships: Passenger Hydrofoils
Russian Passenger Hydrofoils
Romanian Passenger Hydrofoil Express

High-speed craft
Hydrofoils
Ships built by Krasnoye Sormovo Factory No. 112